Bárbara Plà (born 17 July 1983) is a Spanish rugby sevens player. She competed for the Spanish sevens team at the 2016 Summer Olympics. She and her brother Pol, both represented Spain at the Olympics in rugby sevens. She also played at the qualification tournament for the final spot in Ireland.

Pla was on the 2013 Rugby World Cup Sevens squad for Spain.

References

External links 
 

1983 births
Living people
Spain international women's rugby union players
Spain international women's rugby sevens players
Olympic rugby sevens players of Spain
Rugby sevens players at the 2016 Summer Olympics
Rugby union players from Catalonia
People from Sant Cugat del Vallès
Sportspeople from the Province of Barcelona